Black Sheep is a 2006 German / Swiss comedy film directed by Oliver Rihs.

Cast

References

External links 

2006 films
2006 comedy films
German anthology films
Swiss anthology films
German black-and-white films
Swiss black-and-white films
Films set in Berlin
2000s German films